Separate men's and women's Wheelchair Basketball World Championship tournaments were held in 2014.  The women's tournament was held at the Mattamy Athletic Centre in  Toronto, Canada between 20 and 28 June 2014. It was the largest women's wheelchair basketball world championship in history, with 12 national teams participating. Each team selected a squad of 12 players for the tournament.

Medalists

Awards 
Inge Huitzing (Netherlands) was named the most valuable player of the tournament. She was the tournament's top point scorer with 175 points, an average of 21.8 points per game. Janet McLachlan (Canada), Katie Harnock (Canada), Rebecca Murray (United States), Desiree Miller (United States) and  Annika Zeyen (Germany) were named to the All Star Five.

In addition, each team was asked to nominate a player from their team who exemplified the principles of true sport. The True Sport award recipients were: Leanne Del Toso (Australia), Perla Assuncão (Brazil), Katie Harnock (Canada), Yong Qing Fu (China), Emilie Menard (France), Annika Zeyen (Germany), Clare Griffiths (Great Britain), Kyoko Miura (Japan), Floralia Estrada (Mexico), Cher Korver (Netherlands), Pilar Jauregui (Peru), and Kimberly Champion (United States).

Squads 

There were 12 women's teams competing. Each team selected a squad of 12 players for the tournament. Athletes were given an eight-level-score specific to wheelchair basketball, ranging from 0.5 to 4.5. Lower scores represent a higher degree of disability. The sum score of all players on the court cannot exceed 14.

Going into the tournament, the world rankings were:

Qualification 
The 12 teams qualified in a series of zone championships.

No championship was held for the Africa zone, so its spot was allocated to the Americas.

Preliminary round

Group A

Group B

Finals 

 11th vs 12th place game

 9th vs 10th place game

 1st Quarterfinal

 2nd Quarterfinal

 3rd Quarterfinal

 4th Quarterfinal

 1st Consolation

 2nd Consolation

 1st Semifinal

 2nd Semifinal

 7th vs 8th place game

 5th vs 6th place game

 Bronze medal game

 Gold medal game

Final standings

See also 
2014 FIBA World Championship for Women

References

External links 
Official site of the 

 
2014 Wheelchair Basketball World Championship
International women's basketball competitions hosted by Canada
2014 in wheelchair basketball
2014 in women's basketball
2014 in Toronto
team
International sports competitions in Toronto
June 2014 sports events in Canada
Basketball competitions in Toronto